The 1901–02 Butler Christians men's basketball team represented Butler University during the 1901–02 college men's basketball season. The head coach was Walter Kelly, coaching in his third season with the Christians.

Schedule

|-

References

Butler Bulldogs men's basketball seasons
Butler
Butl
Butl